Kimi Takesue is an experimental filmmaker. Her films have screened widely, including at Sundance Film Festival, Locarno Festival, the Museum of Modern Art, International Film Festival Rotterdam, the Los Angeles Film Festival, South by Southwest, ICA London,  Museum of Contemporary Art Shanghai, and the Walker Art Center. Her films have been broadcast on PBS, IFC, and the Sundance Channel. Her awards include a Guggenheim Fellowship, a Rockefeller Media Arts Fellowship, and two NYFA fellowships. She is associate professor at Rutgers University–Newark.

Films

95 and 6 to Go 
95 and 6 to Go (2016) is a feature-length documentary about family, memory and loss, as the filmmaker visits her grandfather. The film won the Prize for Best Feature Documentary at the Los Angeles Asian Pacific International Film Festival, and was nominated for the 2017 European Doc Alliance Award.

Where Are You Taking Me? 
Where Are You Taking Me? (2010) is a feature-length experimental documentary that complicates the relationship between ethnographer and subject. The film depicts the artist's trip through Uganda in poetic glimpses of quotidian life. The New York Times called the film, "an unusual, visually rich visit to the nation." Time Out and LA Weekly selected Where Are You Taking Me? as critics picks. Variety called the film “beautifully meditative" and "an uplifting observational docu that plays on seeing and being seen."

Awards 

Takesue has been awarded fellowships from the Guggenheim Foundation, the Rockefeller Foundation, NYFA, Kodak, the Center for Asian American Media, Yaddo and the MacDowell Colony. Her films have been supported by grants from ITVS, Ford Foundation, and New York State Council on the Arts, amongst others.

References

External links 

Official Website
Takesue at Women Make Movies
Takesue and Icarus Films

Year of birth missing (living people)
Rutgers University faculty
Living people
American film directors of Japanese descent
MacDowell Colony fellows